Shivram may refer to:

Shivram Shankar Apte, aka Dadasaheb Apte (1907–1985), founder and first General Secretary of the Vishva Hindu Parishad
Vaman Shivram Apte (1858–1892), Indian lexicographer and a professor of Sanskrit at Pune's Fergusson College
Shivram Bhoje (born 1942), Indian nuclear scientist who worked in the field of fast-breeder nuclear reactor technology
Shivram Dattatray Joshi (1926–2013), Indian Sanskrit scholar and grammarian based in Pune, Maharashtra
Shivram Karanth (1902–1997), Indian polymath, novelist in Kannada language, playwright and ecological conservationist
Yadav Shivram Mahajan (born 1911), member of the 4th Lok Sabha of India from the Buldhana constituency of Maharashtra
Balakrishna Shivram Moonje (1872–1948), leader of the Hindu Mahasabha in India
Shivram Mahadev Paranjape (1864–1929), Marathi writer, scholar, orator, journalist and freedom fighter
Shivram Dattatreya Phadnis (born 1925), cartoonist and illustrator from India
Shivram Rango Rane (1901–1970), politician from Bombay State
Purushottam Shivram Rege (1910–1978), Marathi writer from Maharashtra, India
Ivaturi Shivram (born 1954), former Indian cricket umpire
K. Shivram (born 1953), Indian actor, politician and former bureaucrat
Palwankar Shivram (1878–1941), Indian cricketer
Pratap Shivram Singh, Indian politician, social worker and British Indian Army soldier

See also
Shiv Ram
Shivam (disambiguation)
Shivaram